The Alderney official football team is the official football team representing Alderney (the third largest of the Channel Islands) in non-FIFA international football. They play their home matches at Arsenal Ground. They are not affiliated with FIFA or UEFA.

The team plays in the Muratti Vase, a cup competition started in 1905, in which the Channel Islands of Alderney, Guernsey and Jersey play against each other. Alderney have only won the competition once, in 1920. The Muratti format requires Alderney to play a semi-final match against the other islands on a rota basis but always with Alderney being the home side. The winner of the match goes on to play the remaining island in the final. Alderney also play the occasional game outside the Muratti competition including taking part in the Island Games football tournament in 2003 in which they finished 11th out of a pool of 15.

An Alderney Football Club side was formed to play in the 2016–17 Guernsey Priaulx League.

The Alderney national football team won their first match in 14 years at the 2017 Island Games, beating the Falkland Islands 0–3 in a 15th place play off.

Results and fixtures

Selected Internationals opponents
As of 23 April 2022 after match against

Competitive record

Island Games

Muratti Vase

Managers
 Craig Culkin (1994–2011)
 Alan Adamson (2011–2019)
 Josh Concanen (2019–present)

References

External links
List of matches in Roon Ba

Football in Alderney
Alderney
Sports teams in Guernsey